Newsworld International (NWI) was an American news-oriented cable and satellite television network that operated from June 1994 to July 2005. The network carried a mix of newscasts from the Canadian Broadcasting Corporation and other international networks. After several ownership changes, the channel was purchased by former U.S. Vice President Al Gore and other parties in 2005 and became Current TV.

History
The network was launched on June 1, 1994, as a joint venture between the Canadian Broadcasting Corporation (CBC) and Power Corporation of Canada along with sister channel Trio. It aired much of the same programming as the CBC-owned Canadian cable news channel CBC Newsworld. During the late 1990s, Newsworld International's Sunday evening newscast at 7:00 p.m. Eastern Time aired on CBC-owned CBET in Windsor, Ontario as a replacement for the ABC family movie anthology series The Wonderful World of Disney, which aired on most other CBC stations in that timeslot (Windsor is part of the Detroit market for programming purposes, as such, stations in Southwestern Ontario near the U.S.–Canada border pre-empt certain U.S.-based programs whose rights are held by Canadian networks to avoid paying higher advertising rates).

The channel reached about 20 million homes and provided news coverage from a variety of global perspectives. It also acted as a news source for Canadians who reside or were visiting the United States, Latin America or the Caribbean. The channel was available across the United States mainly on satellite provider DirecTV.

In 2000, Newsworld International was sold to USA Networks for $155 million, which was subsequently acquired by Vivendi (which later merged with Universal Pictures to become Vivendi Universal). The CBC maintained day-to-day operation of the channel afterward. The network's main in-house news program was NWI International NewsFirst.

Shutdown and replacements
In 2004, Newsworld International was purchased by former U.S. Vice President Al Gore and Joel Hyatt, who acquired it mainly for the channel's digital cable and satellite coverage reach, and were not interested in maintaining the network's existing format. Programming on Newsworld continued to be provided by the CBC until July 31, 2005; on that date, the network ceased operations with a special farewell message from the channel's Toronto offices on behalf of the Canadian Broadcasting Corporation at the Canadian Broadcasting Centre.

Gore and Hyatt relaunched the channel at midnight on August 1 as Current TV, specializing in a youth perspective on national issues. Gore and Hyatt chose the format after deciding that a liberal-focused news network would be rejected by national advertisers. The new channel, despite being profitable, underwent a major reorganization in 2010 after a "troubled" history, eventually evolving it into a progressive-leaning news and documentary channel. Gore and his partners sold the network to Al Jazeera Media Network in 2013, which like Gore and Hyatt before them, was mainly interested in taking over the channel's existing carriage deals, using Current's channel space to launch the internationally focused news channel Al Jazeera America that August. Al Jazeera America in turn failed in April 2016, after which the channel space created by NWI in 1994 ceased to exist.

After the closure of the channel, the CBC began uploading some of its news programs and reports as clips on CBC.ca for online viewing worldwide. Today, CBC News Network – the former parent channel of Newsworld International – carries many of the CBC programs formerly seen on Newsworld, and is available worldwide outside of Canada online through paid subscriptions.

Programming

Original series
Newsworld International produced Special Assignment, a half-hour documentary series hosted by veteran CBC correspondent Bill Cunningham, featuring a different country in each episode. The format included a segment of historical context on the featured country with archive footage narrated by Cunningham, followed by a recap of recent political developments and current events. The program often featured interviews with high-ranking government officials and political insiders. During its run, Special Assignment visited many countries in Europe, East Asia and Latin America as well as countries in Africa and the Caribbean. Reruns of earlier editions often included updated narrations to reflect recent developments.

NWI contributors at shutdown
 CBC Newsworld/News Network  – The National and its weekend substitutes CBC News: Saturday Report and CBC News: Sunday Night, CBC News: Correspondent, The Nature of Things, Hot Type, entertainment show >play, most of its international news output (including Hemispheres, a partnership with the Australian Broadcasting Corporation), as well as NWI's internal newscasts and newsmagazines
 Deutsche Welle  – the network's English newscast and its English weekend newsmagazine
 NHK  – the network's major English newscast and its English weekend newsmagazine
 CCTV-9  – the network's major English newscast
 ITV  – the domestic Evening News (produced by ITN)

Subtitled NWI newscasts discontinued before shutdown
  – RDI
  – TV Azteca
  – NTV, Channel One

Other programming
Washington Outlook with Henry Champ
World Business
NWI World Sports

Former on-air staff

Anchors
Newsworld International was anchored by a team of CBC talent which included 

 Henry Champ
 John Dawe
 Terry Glecoff
 Karen Hawryluk
 Chris Henry
 Ron Izawa
 Doreen Kays
 Jordan Kerbel
 Fred Langan
 Paul Lethbridge
 Sandra Lewis
 Sharon Lewis
 Helen Mann
 Jennifer Mossop
 Jim Reed 
 Nerene Virgin

See also
Al Jazeera America - successor in interest to Newsworld International
CBC News Network - Newsworld's parent channel (then known as CBC Newsworld)

References

External links

International final signoff and conversion to Current TV

CBC News Network
Defunct television networks in the United States
Defunct mass media companies of the United States
Television channels and stations established in 1994
Television channels and stations disestablished in 2005
Power Corporation of Canada
CBC News
Current TV
Former Canadian Broadcasting Corporation television networks